Sabrina Van Tassel (born 1975, Neuilly-sur-Seine) is a French-American journalist and director.

Filmography

Director 

 2002 : Oya isola (short film)
 2004 : Husbands for the Worst (short film)
 2010 : The Lost Soldiers of the IDF (short film)
 2008 : The Rivka Tribe (short film)
 2014:  The Silenced Walls 
 2017 : Women On Death Row (short film)
 2020 : The State of Texas vs. Melissa

Actress 

 1996 : Coup de vice dir. Patrick Levy
 1997 : La Vérité si je mens ! dir. Thomas Gilou
 1999 : The Parasites dir. Philippe de Chauveron
 2001 : La Vérité si je mens ! 2 dir. Thomas Gilou
 2001 : Two Days, Nine Lives dir. Simon Monjack

References 

1975 births
Living people